Sissyphobia: Gay Men and Effeminate Behavior is a book by gay author Tim Bergling, published in 2001, that investigates why some gay men are more masculine than others and why society finds effeminate men objectionable. The neologism sissyphobia designates the fear or hatred of effeminate men, pejoratively called sissies.

While researching this topic, Bergling interviewed a number of men, both straight and gay, and analyzed the contents of personal ad sections of dozens of gay newspapers from the US. Bergling found that 40 percent of the ads were masculine-themed, for instance containing clichés like "straight acting", while only two percent were feminine-themed. Bergling argues that many "straight-acting" gay men see effeminate gay men as slowing the process towards gays achieving equal rights. For example, he found that masculine gay men point to press coverage of gay pride events where only a small percentage of the attendees are drag queens, yet the press focuses on the latter. Bergling confesses that "I still wrestle with some sissyphobia myself, as do many of my interviewees."

References

External links
 Bergling, Tim. Sissyphobia: Gay Men and Effeminate Behavior.

See also
Heterosexism
Homophobia
Sexism
Femme

2001 non-fiction books
English-language books
Gay effeminacy
Gay non-fiction books
Sexism
2000s LGBT literature
LGBT literature in the United States